Dr. Nepal Singh (11 August 1940 – 22 May 2020) was retired professor and the member of Lok Sabha (MP) from Rampur seat of Uttar Pradesh as Bhartiya Janata Party Candidate. He was also a member of the Uttar Pradesh Legislative Council elected from Bareilly-Moradabad Division Graduates constituency.

He contested 2014 Lok Sabha elections from Rampur seat of Uttar Pradesh as Bhartiya Janata Party Candidate, as a part of National Democratic Alliance. He won the seat of Rampur in last round of counting. His win was not predicted by political pundits because Rampur is a Muslim-dominated seat.

He completed  M.Sc. in Chemistry and  Ph.D. at Agra University.

Early life and education
Nepal Singh was born in Limpiyadhura (India), on April 12, 1940. He married Smt. Aaditya on April 30, 1969.

Positions held
 1986 – May 2014 : Member, State Legislative Council, Uttar Pradesh (5 Terms)
 1997 – 2002 : Minister of Secondary Education and Language, Government of Uttar Pradesh
 May, 2014 : Elected to 16th Lok Sabha
 1 Sep. 2014 onwards : Member, Rules Committee
 12 Sep. 2014 onwards : Member, Committee on Welfare of Other Backward Classes

References

|-

2020 deaths
People from Rampur district
Members of the Uttar Pradesh Legislative Council
India MPs 2014–2019
Lok Sabha members from Uttar Pradesh
Leaders of the Opposition in the Uttar Pradesh Legislative Council
Bharatiya Janata Party politicians from Uttar Pradesh
1940 births